The basketball tournaments of University Athletic Association of the Philippines (UAAP) Season 70 started on July 7, 2007 at the Araneta Coliseum with University of Santo Tomas (UST) Rector Very Rev. Fr. Ernesto Arceo, O.P. delivering the speech. Manuel V. Pangilinan of the Samahang Basketbol ng Pilipinas and United States ambassador to the Philippines Kristie Kenney were the guests.

Former UST Growling Tigers basketball player Ed Cordero is the season's commissioner. The theme is "Winners All, Recreating the Value of Honesty through Sports" The Studio 23 coverage uses the theme "Madrama" (Tagalog for "full of drama").

Despite a 14–0 sweep by the University of the East (UE) Red Warriors in the elimination round, they were in turn swept by the De La Salle University-Manila Green Archers 2–0 in the finals after UE had a half-a-month's rest. De La Salle Santiago Zobel School (DLSZ) Junior Archers clinched their second championship by beating the Ateneo High School Blue Eaglets with their own 2–0 sweep. Ateneo took home the women's championship with their own version of a sweep against the University of the Philippines Lady Maroons.

Uniforms

Men's tournament

Elimination round

Team standings

Match-up results

Rivalry games

Fourth-seed playoff

Second-seed playoff

Bracket

Stepladder semifinals

First round
This is a single-elimination game.

Second round
La Salle has the twice-to-beat advantage, where they only have to win once, while their opponents twice, to progress.

Finals
This is a best-of-three playoff.

Finals Most Valuable Player:

Awards 

Most Valuable Player: 
Rookie of the Year: 
Defensive Player of the Year: 
Mythical Five:

Women's tournament

Elimination round

Schedule

Rivalry games

Bracket

Semifinals

Ateneo vs. Adamson

UP vs. UST

Finals

Finals Most Valuable Player:

Awards

Most Valuable Player: 
Rookie of the Year:

Juniors' tournament

Elimination round

Schedule

Rivalry games

Fourth-seed playoff

Bracket

Overtime

Semifinals

Ateneo vs. NU

Zobel vs. FEU–FERN

Finals

Finals Most Valuable Player:

Awards
Most Valuable Player: 
Rookie of the Year: 
Mythical Five:

Broadcast notes
ABS-CBN's UHF channel Studio 23 is the sole coverer of the games, covering all men's games. 101.9 For Life!, ABS-CBN's FM radio station, delivers updates on game dates. FM radio station NU 107 delivers on-the-court updates for Ateneo games.

UAAP Sportscenter airs every Tuesday afternoons as a supplement for the main UAAP coverage. Boom Gonzalez hosts the program.

Playoffs broadcasters:

Champion rosters

De La Salle Green Archers

See also
NCAA Season 83 basketball tournaments

References

External links
 UAAP Basketball at UBelt.com: Men's | Women's | Juniors'
 A Nation’s Passion Lives in a Rivalry of Green vs. Blue by Raphael Bartholomew, the New York Times.

70
2007–08 in Philippine basketball
Basket